The word shampoo in English is derived from Hindi chāmpo, and dates to 1762.   The Hindi word referred to head massage, usually with some form of hair oil.  Similar words also occur in other North Indian languages.

The word and the service of head massage were introduced to Britain by a Bengali entrepreneur Sake Dean Mahomed.  Dean Mahomed introduced the practice to Basil Cochrane's vapour baths while working there in London in the early 19th century, and later, together with his Irish wife, opened "Mahomed's Steam and Vapour Sea Water Medicated Baths" in Brighton, England.  His baths were like Turkish baths where clients received an Indian treatment of champi (shampooing), meaning therapeutic massage.  The practice became fashionable in Brighton and he was appointed ‘Shampooing Surgeon’ to both George IV and William IV.

In India, the traditional hair massage is still common. Different oils and formulations with herbs may be used; these include neem, shikakai or soapnut, henna, bael, brahmi, fenugreek, buttermilk, amla, aloe, and almond in combination with some aromatic components like sandalwood, jasmine, turmeric, rose, and musk.

Notes 

Hairdressing
Massage therapy